Evelyn Marie Gillespie (born April 1, 1952) is a Canadian former politician. She served as MLA for the Comox Valley riding in the Legislative Assembly of British Columbia from 1996 to 2001, as a member of the British Columbia New Democratic Party.

She graduated from the University of British Columbia in 1976 with a degree in recreation education.

Before her election as an MLA, she co-ordinated volunteer programs at a Calgary shelter for abused women and their children and also worked as a co-ordinator of volunteer programs at the Addiction Research Foundation in Toronto and with the Vancouver Health Department.

She also operated a small resort in the Comox Valley and now owns and operates the Laughing Oyster Bookshop in Courtenay, British Columbia.

References

1952 births
20th-century Canadian politicians
21st-century Canadian politicians
20th-century Canadian women politicians
21st-century Canadian women politicians
Living people
British Columbia New Democratic Party MLAs
Women government ministers of Canada
Members of the Executive Council of British Columbia
Politicians from Calgary
University of British Columbia alumni
Women MLAs in British Columbia